Mandamarri is a town and a municipality in Mancherial district in the Indian state of Telangana.

Demographics 
 India census, Mandamarri had a population of 66,176. Males constitute 51% of the population and females 49%. Mandamarri has an average literacy rate of 61%, higher than the national average of 59.5%. Male literacy is 70%, and female literacy is 52%. 10% of the population is under 6 years of age.

Minerals 

In Mandamarri several under ground and open cast coal mines under Singareni Collieries Company Limited (SCCL) (Singareni Coal Mines). Most of the people occupation is agriculture.

Government and politics

Civic administration 

Mandamarri Municipality was constituted in 1952 and is classified as a second grade municipality with 36 election wards.

Schools 
Little Flowers High School
Singareni Collieries High School
Carmel High School
ZPSS Mandamarri
UPS School mandamarri
Tawakkal High school
 Montessori High School
 Model School 
 Sri chaitanya High school

Parks 
Singareni Green Park

Administrative Division 
There are nine villages in Mandamarri.

References 

Cities and towns in Mancherial district
Mandal headquarters in Mancherial district